The three Round Table Conferences of 1930–1932 were a series of peace conferences organized by the British Government and Indian political personalities to discuss constitutional reforms in India. These started in November 1930 and ended in December 1932. They were conducted as per the recommendation of Muhammad Ali Jinnah to Viceroy Lord Irwin and Prime Minister Ramsay MacDonald, and by the report submitted by the Simon Commission in May 1930. Demands for Swaraj or self-rule in India had been growing increasingly strong. B. R. Ambedkar, Jinnah, Sir Tej Bahadur Sapru, V. S. Srinivasa Sastri, Sir Muhammad Zafrulla Khan, K. T. Paul and Mirabehn were key participants from India. By the 1930s, many British politicians believed that India needed to move towards dominion status. However, there were significant disagreements between the Indian and the British political parties that the Conferences would not resolve. The key topic was about constitution and India which was mainly discussed in that conference. There were three Round Table Conferences from 1930 to 1932.

First Round Table Conference (November 1930 – January 1931) 
The Round Table Conference officially inaugurated by His Majesty George V on November 12, 1930 in Royal Gallery House of Lords at London and chaired by the Prime Minister. Ramsay MacDonald was also chairman of a subcommittee on minority representation, while for the duration his son, Malcolm MacDonald, performed liaison tasks with Lord Sankey's constitutional committee.  One of the foremost advisers was Sir Malcolm Hailey, an Indian civil servant with thirty years experience. The leading Liberal on the committee, Lord Reading was "well aware of the troubles which might arise if and when India became independent." Clement Attlee, who served on the Simon Commission, wanted an early resolution but was baulked by the Conservatives in government until 1945.  Sir Samuel Hoare wrote the cabinet a memo recommending a federal formula for the Government of India to "make it possible to give a semblance of responsible government and yet retain the realities and verities of British control." The idea was proposed by the princely states and other Liberal Indian leaders including Sir Tej Bahadur Sapru would welcome it. The minority Labour government hoped to win the support of Liberal and Conservative colleagues in parliament for a "responsive" Indian government at central and provincial levels and a conservative legislature.

The eight British political parties were represented by sixteen delegates. There were fifty-eight political leaders from British India and sixteen delegates from the princely states. In total 74 delegates from India attended the Conference. However, the Indian National Congress, along with Indian business leaders, kept away from the conference. Many of them were in jail for their participation in Civil Disobedience Movement. Lord Irwin made a controversial statement declaring that India should be eventually granted Dominionship. After a discussion in Delhi in December 1929, Gandhi had refused to attend the London meetings.  In accordance with the law the Viceroy arrested Gandhi sending him to prison.  However the Mahatma's presence would prove vital for the conference success.  The culmination of events were settled by the Gandhi–Irwin Pact (1931). A chastised Gandhi wanted the peaceful end to civil disobedience demanded by the Viceroy and his Council.  Lord Irwin was triumphant but the Simon Commission had failed to gauge the determination of Indian opinion to ultimately bring independence. The Conservatives were disgusted: "the whole conference was manipulated and manoeuvred by the Socialist Party, said Sir Winston Churchill, "to achieve the result they had set before themselves from the beginning, namely the conferring of responsible government at the centre upon Indians."

Participants
 British Representatives:
 Labour: Ramsay MacDonald, Lord Sankey, Wedgwood Benn, Arthur Henderson, J. H. Thomas, William Jowitt, Hastings Lees-Smith, Earl Russell
 Conservative: Earl Peel, Marquess of Zetland, Samuel Hoare, Oliver Stanley
 Liberal: Marquess of Reading, Marquess of Lothian, Sir Robert Hamilton, Isaac Foot
 Muslim League: Aga Khan III (leader of British-Indian delegation), Muhammad Ali Jinnah, Maulana Mohammad Ali Jauhar, Muhammad Shafi, Muhammad Zafarullah Khan, Sir Abdul Halim Ghuznavi, Sir Ghulam Hussain Hidayatullah, AK Fazlul Huq, Dr. Shafa'at Ahmad Khan, Raja Sher Muhammad Khan of Domeli
 Indian States' Representatives: Maharaja of Alwar, Maharaja of Baroda, Maharaja of Darbhanga, Nawab of Bhopal, Maharaja of Bikaner, Rana of Dholpur, Maharaja of Jammu and Kashmir, Maharaja of Nawanagar, Maharaja of Patiala (Chancellor of the Chamber of Princes), Maharaja of Rewa, Chief Sahib of Sangli, Sir Prabhashankar Pattani (Bhavnagar), Manubhai Mehta (Baroda), Sardar Sahibzada Sultan Ahmed Khan (Gwalior), Akbar Hydari (Hyderabad), Mirza Ismail (Mysore), Kailash Narain Haksar (Jammu and Kashmir)
 British-Indian Representatives:
 Hindus: B. S. Moonje, M. R. Jayakar, Diwan Bahadur Raja Narendra Nath
 Liberals: J. N. Basu, Tej Bahadur Sapru, C. Y. Chintamani, V. S. Srinivasa Sastri, Chimanlal Harilal Setalvad
 Justice Party: Arcot Ramasamy Mudaliar, Bhaskarrao Vithojirao Jadhav, Sir A. P. Patro
 Depressed Classes: B. R. Ambedkar, Rettamalai Srinivasan
 Sikhs: Sardar Ujjal Singh, Sardar Sampuran Singh
 Parsis: Phiroze Sethna, Cowasji Jehangir, Homi Mody
 Indian Christians: K. T. Paul (All India Conference of Indian Christians)
 Europeans: Sir Hubert Carr, Sir Oscar de Glanville (Burma), T. F. Gavin Jones, C. E. Wood (Madras)
 Anglo-Indians: Henry Gidney
 Women: Begum Jahanara Shahnawaz, Radhabai Subbarayan
 Landlords: Maharaja Kameshwar Singh of Darbhanga (Bihar), Muhammad Ahmad Said Khan Chhatari (United Provinces), Raja of Parlakimedi (Orissa), Provash Chandra Mitter
 Labour: N. M. Joshi, B. Shiva Rao
 Universities: Syed Sultan Ahmed, Bisheshwar Dayal Seth
 Burma: U Aung Thin, Ba U, M. M. Ohn Ghine
 Sindh: Shah Nawaz Bhutto, Ghulam Hussain Hidayatullah
 Other Provinces: Chandradhar Barua (Assam), Sahibzada Abdul Qayyum (NWFP), S. B. Tambe (Central Provinces)
 Government of India: Narendra Nath Law, Bhupendra Nath Mitra, C. P. Ramaswami Iyer, M. Ramachandra Rao
 Officials attending in consultative capacity: W. M. Hailey, C. A. Innes, A. C. MacWatters, Sir Henry G. Haig, L. W. Reynolds
 Indian States Delegation Staff:
 Hyderabad: Sir Richard Chenevix-Trench, Nawab Mahdi Yar Jung, Ahmed Hussain, Nawab Sir Amin Jung Bahadur, Reginald Glancy
 South Indian States: T. Raghavaiah
 Baroda: V. T. Krishnamachari
 Alwar: Fateh Naseeb Khan
 Orissa States: K. C. Neogy
 Nominated by the Chamber of Princes Special Organisation: L. F. Rushbrook Williams, Qazi Ali Haidar Abbasi, Jarmani Dass, Anna Babaji Latthe, D. A. Surve
 Secretariats:  S. K. Brown, V. Dawson, K. S. Fitze, W. H. Lewis, R. J. Stopford, John Coatman, Marmaduke Pickthall, K. M. Panikkar, N. S. Subba Rao, Geoffrey Corbett, A. Latifi, Girija Shankar Bajpai
 Secretariat-General: R. H. A. Carter, Mian Abdul Aziz, W. D. Croft, G. E. J. Gent, B. G. Holdsworth, R. F. Mudie, G. S. Rajadhyaksha

Proceedings
The conference started with six plenary meetings where delegates put forward their issues nine sub-committees were formed to deal with several different matters including federal structure, provincial constitution, province of Sindh and NWFP, defense services and minorities e.t.c. These were followed by discussions on the reports of the sub-committees on Federal Structure, Provincial Constitution, Minorities, Burma, North West Frontier Province, Franchise, Defense services and Sindh. These were followed by 2 more plenary meetings and a final concluding session. It was difficult for progress to be made in the absence of the Indian National Congress but some advances were made. The Prime Minister wrote his diary "India has not considered. It was communalism and proportions of reserved seats" that exposed the worst side of Indian politics.

The idea of an All-India Federation was moved to the centre of discussion by Tej Bahadur Sapru. All the groups attending the conference supported this concept. The princely states agreed to the proposed federation provided that their internal sovereignty was guaranteed. The Muslim League also supported the federation as it had always been opposed to a strong Centre. The British agreed that representative government should be introduced on provincial level.

The Congress, which had boycotted the first conference, was requested to come to a settlement by Sapru, M. R. Jayakar and V. S. Srinivasa Sastri. A settlement between Mahatma Gandhi and Viceroy Lord Irwin brought the Congress to the second session of Round Table Conference, which opened on 7 September. Although MacDonald was still Prime Minister of Britain, he was by this time heading a coalition Government (the "National Government") with a Conservative majority, including Sir Samuel Hoare as a new Secretary of State for India. On 7 November 1931 Gandhi secretly met with Malcolm MacDonald in his rooms at Balliol College, Oxford. He took the opportunity to gain publicity from a tour of the East End and visit to Lancashire cotton mills, but could not persuade the government to grant self-rule: of more urgency was the gathering Agrarian Crisis and Congress newest campaign for a Fair rent.

The discussion led to the passing of the Government of India Act 1935, yet the Governor of United Provinces was happy to be rid of Gandhi's campaigns "playing havoc with six or seven million tenants in the UP." When Nehru decried that the famine relief programme was pitiful, he was already asking for a kisan rent strike, and Patel called for a satyagraha. When quizzed in London about his intentions for the conference, Gandhi averred he could do nothing about agrarian problems from England. Little was achieved other than the Government realised they had to tackle absentee landlordism in India to avert disaster.

Second Round Table Conference (September 1931 – December 1931)

Participants
 British Representatives:
 Labour: Ramsay MacDonald, Wedgwood Benn, Arthur Henderson, William Jowitt, Hastings Lees-Smith, F. W. Pethick-Lawrence, Lord Sankey, Lord Snell, J. H. Thomas
 Conservative: Viscount Hailsham, Samuel Hoare, Earl Peel, Oliver Stanley, Marquess of Zetland
 Scottish Unionist: Walter Elliot
 Liberal: Isaac Foot, Henry Graham White, Robert Hamilton, Marquess of Lothian, Marquess of Reading,
 Indian States' Representatives: Maharaja of Alwar, Maharaja of Baroda, Maharaja Of Darbhanga, Nawab of Bhopal, Maharaja of Bikaner, Maharao of Kutch, Rana of Dholpur, Maharaja of Indore, Maharaja of Jammu and Kashmir, Maharaja of Kapurthala, Maharaja of Nawanagar, Maharaja of Patiala, Maharaja of Rewa, Chief Sahib of Sangli, Raja of Korea, Raja of Sarila, Sir Prabhashankar Pattani (Bhavnagar), Manubhai Mehta (Baroda), Sardar Sahibzada Sultan Ahmed Khan (Gwalior), Sir Muhammad Akbar Hydari (Hyderabad), Mirza Ismail (Mysore), Col. K.N. Haksar (Jammu and Kashmir), T. Raghavaiah (Travancore), Liaqat Hayat Khan (Patiala)
 British-Indian Representatives:
 Government of India: C. P. Ramaswami Iyer, Narendra Nath Law, M. Ramachandra Rao
 Indian National Congress: Mahatma Gandhi (He was the sole representative of the Congress).
 Muslims: Aga Khan III, Maulana Shaukat Ali, Muhammad Ali Jinnah, A. K. Fazlul Huq, Sir Muhammad Iqbal, Muhammad Shafi, Muhammad Zafarullah Khan, Sir Syed Ali Imam, Maulvi Muhammad Shafi Daudi, Raja Sher Muhammad Khan of Domeli, A. H. Ghuznavi, Hafiz Hidayat Hussain, Sayed Muhammad Padshah Saheb Bahadur, Dr. Shafa'at Ahmad Khan, Jamal Muhammad Rowther, Khwaja Mian Rowther, Nawab Sahibzada Sayed Muhammad Mehr Shah
 Hindus: M. R. Jayakar, B. S. Moonje, Diwan Bahadur Raja Narendra Nath
 Liberals: J. N. Basu, C. Y. Chintamani, Tej Bahadur Sapru, V. S. Srinivasa Sastri, Chimanlal Harilal Setalvad
 Justice Party: Raja of Bobbili, Arcot Ramasamy Mudaliar, Sir A. P. Patro, Bhaskarrao Vithojirao Jadhav
 Depressed Classes: B. R. Ambedkar, Rettamalai Srinivasan
 Sikhs: Sardar Ujjal Singh, Sardar Sampuran Singh
 Parsis: Cowasji Jehangir, Homi Mody, Phiroze Sethna
 Indian Christians: Surendra Kumar Datta, A. T. Pannirselvam
 Europeans: E. C. Benthall, Sir Hubert Carr, T. F. Gavin Jones, C. E. Wood (Madras)
 Anglo-Indians: Henry Gidney
 Women: Sarojini Naidu, Begum Jahanara Shahnawaz, Radhabai Subbarayan
 Landlords: Muhammad Ahmad Said Khan Chhatari (United Provinces), Kameshwar Singh of Darbhanga (Bihar), Raja of Parlakimedi (Orissa), Sir Provash Chandra Mitter
 Industry: Ghanshyam Das Birla, Sir Purshottamdas Thakurdas, Maneckji Dadabhoy
 Labour: N. M. Joshi, B. Shiva Rao, V. V. Giri
 Universities: Syed Sultan Ahmed, Bisheshwar Dayal Seth
 Burma: Sir Padamji Ginwala
 Sindh: Shah Nawaz Bhutto, Ghulam Hussain Hidayatullah
 Other Provinces: Chandradhar Barua (Assam), Sahibzada Abdul Qayyum (NWFP), S. B. Tambe (Central Provinces)
 Indian States Delegation Staff: V. T. Krishnamachari (Baroda), Richard Chenevix-Trench (Hyderabad), Nawab Mahdi Yar Jung (Hyderabad), S. M. Bapna (Indore), Amar Nath Atal (Jaipur), J. W. Young (Jodhpur), Ram Chandra Kak (Jammu and Kashmir), Sahibzada Abdus Samad Khan (Rampur), K. C. Neogy (Orissa states), L. F. Rushbrook Williams, Jarmani Dass, Muhammad Saleh Akbar Hydari, K. M. Panikkar, N. Madhava Rao
 British Delegation Staff: H. G. Haig, V. Dawson, K. S. Fitze, J. G. Laithwaite, W. H. Lewis, P. J. Patrick, John Coatman, G. T. Garratt, R. J. Stopford
 British Indian Delegation Staff: Geoffrey Corbett, A. Latifi, Girija Shankar Bajpai, Benegal Rama Rau, Syed Amjad Ali, Prince Aly Khan, A. M. Chaudhury, Mahadev Desai, Govind Malaviya, K. T. Shah, P. Sinha
 Secretariat-General: R. H. A. Carter, K. Anderson, C. D. Deshmukh, J. M. Sladen, Hugh MacGregor, G. F. Steward, A. H. Joyce, Syed Amjad Ali, Ram Babu Saksena

Proceedings
The Second Session opened on September 7, 1931. There were three major differences between the first and second Round Table Conferences. By the second:

 Congress Representation — The Gandhi–Irwin Pact opened the way for Congress participation in this conference. Gandhi was invited from India and attended as the sole official Congress representative accompanied by Sarojini Naidu and also Madan Mohan Malaviya, Ghanshyam Das Birla, Muhammad Iqbal, Sir Mirza Ismail (Diwan of Mysore), S.K. Dutta and Sir Syed Ali Imam. Gandhi claimed that the Congress alone represented political India; that the Untouchables were Hindus and should not be treated as a “minority”; and that there should be no separate electorates or special safeguards for Muslims or other minorities. These claims were rejected by the other Indian participants. According to this pact, Gandhi was asked to call off the Civil Disobedience Movement (CDM) and if he did so the prisoners of the British government would be freed except the criminal prisoners, i.e. those who had killed British officials. He returned to India, disappointed with the results and empty-handed.
 National Government — two weeks earlier the Labour government in London had fallen. Ramsay MacDonald now headed a National Government dominated by the Conservative Party.
 Financial Crisis – During the conference, Britain went off the Gold Standard, further distracting the National Government.

At the end of the conference Ramsay MacDonald undertook to produce a Communal Award for minority representation, with the provision that any free agreement between the parties could be substituted for his award.

Gandhi took particular exception to the treatment of untouchables as a minority separate from the rest of the Hindu community. Other important discussions were the responsibility of the executive to the legislature and a separate electorate for the Untouchables as demanded by Dr. B. R. Ambedkar.
Gandhi announced that henceforth he would work only on behalf of the Harijans: he reached a compromise with the leader of depressed classes, Dr. B. R. Ambedkar, over this issue; the two eventually resolved the situation with the Poona Pact of 1932. But not before the conference of All-India Depressed Classes had specifically 'denounced the claim made by Gandhi.'

Third Round Table Conference (November – December 1932)
The third and last session assembled on November 17, 1932. Only forty-six delegates attended since most of the main political figures of India were not present. The Labour Party from Britain and the Indian National Congress refused to attend.

From September 1931 until March 1933, under the supervision of the Secretary of State for India, Sir Samuel Hoare, the proposed reforms took the form reflected in the Government of India Act 1935.

Participants
 Indian States' Representatives: Dewan Kishen Pershad (Dewan of Hyderabad), Mirza Ismail (Dewan of Mysore), V. T. Krishnamachari (Dewan of Baroda), Wajahat Hussain (Jammu and Kashmir), Sir Sukhdeo Prasad (Udaipur, Jaipur, Jodhpur), D. A. Surve (Kolhapur), Raja Oudh Narain Bisarya (Bhopal), Manubhai Mehta (Bikaner), Nawab Liaqat Hayat Khan (Patiala), Fateh Naseeb Khan (Alwar State), L. F. Rushbrook Williams (Nawanagar), Raja of Sarila (small states)
 British-Indian Representatives: Aga Khan III, Sir Dr. Allama Muhammad Iqbal, B. R. Ambedkar (Depressed Classes separate Electorate), Ramakrishna Ranga Rao of Bobbili, Sir Hubert Carr (Europeans), Nanak Chand Pandit, A. H. Ghuznavi, Henry Gidney (Anglo-Indians), Hafiz Hidayat Hussain, M. R. Jayakar, Cowasji Jehangir, N. M. Joshi (Labour), Narasimha Chintaman Kelkar, Arcot Ramasamy Mudaliar, Begum Jahanara Shahnawaz (Women), A. P. Patro, Tej Bahadur Sapru, Dr. Shafa'at Ahmad Khan, Sir Shadi Lal, Tara Singh Malhotra, Sir Nripendra Nath Sircar, Sir Purshottamdas Thakurdas, Muhammad Zafarullah Khan.

Notes

References

Further reading

External links
Golmej Sammelan in Hindi - गोलमेज सम्मलेन (1931-1932)
70th Anniversary of Indian Independence - 1931 Indian Round Table Conference- UK Parliament Living Heritage
 Essay on Indian Constitutional Round Table Conferences, London 1931–1933
Buy Conference Tables Oregon

1931 in British India
Pakistan Movement
1930 in India
1931 in India
1932 in India
Indian independence movement
Conferences in London
1930 conferences
1931 conferences
1932 conferences
1932 in British India
1930 in British India
1930s in the City of Westminster